Richard Lacy (16 January 1841 – 11 April 1929) was an Irish-born prelate of the Roman Catholic Church. He served as the first Bishop of Middlesbrough from 1879 to 1929.

Biography
Born in Navan, County Meath, Ireland on 16 January 1841, he was ordained to the priesthood on 21 December 1867. He was appointed the Bishop of the Diocese of Middlesbrough by the Holy See on 12 September 1879. His consecration to the Episcopate took place on 18 December 1879, the principal consecrator was Cardinal Henry Edward Manning, Archbishop of Westminster, and the principal co-consecrators were Bishop Robert Cornthwaite of Leeds and Bishop Bernard O'Reilly of Liverpool.

He died in office in Middlesbrough on 11 April 1929, aged 88.

References

1841 births
1929 deaths
19th-century Roman Catholic bishops in England
20th-century Roman Catholic bishops in England
Irish emigrants to the United Kingdom
People from Navan
People from County Meath
Roman Catholic bishops of Middlesbrough
English College, Rome alumni
Contributors to the Catholic Encyclopedia